Chhaya is the Hindu goddess of shadow.

Chhaya may also refer to:
 Chhaya, India, a city in the state of Gujarat, India
 Chhaya (film), a 1961 Hindi film
 Chhaya Devi (1914–2001), Indian film actress

See also 
 Chaya (disambiguation)